Koltsovka is a rural locality (a selo) in Sapronovsky Selsoviet of Mazanovsky District, Amur Oblast, Russia. The population was 38 as of 2018. There is 1 street.

Geography 
Koltsovka is located on the right bank of the Birma River, 44 km south of Novokiyevsky Uval (the district's administrative centre) by road. Kanichi is the nearest rural locality.

References 

Rural localities in Mazanovsky District